End of life announcement (EOLA) is the beginning of end-of-life. The EOLA will precede the last order date (LOD) by up to 90 days. Customers need to order before LOD if products/spares are needed. JEDEC standards specify the end of the product life cycle.

The end of life announcement happens before the product ends.

See also
 Product change notification

References

Product management
Software release